Ricardo Fontana (born 17 October 1950) is a Bolivian footballer. He played in 13 matches for the Bolivia national football team in 1989. He was also part of Bolivia's squad for the 1989 Copa América tournament.

References

External links
 

1950 births
Living people
Bolivian footballers
Bolivia international footballers
Association football defenders
Footballers from Córdoba, Argentina
The Strongest players
Club Bolívar players
Club Always Ready players
Oriente Petrolero players
Chaco Petrolero players
Bolivian football managers
Independiente Petrolero managers
The Strongest managers
Club Real Potosí managers
Club San José managers
Club Aurora managers
Club Deportivo Guabirá managers